Garden State Plaza (officially Westfield Garden State Plaza) is a shopping mall located in Paramus, New Jersey, United States. Opened in 1957 as the first suburban shopping mall in New Jersey, it has  of leasable space, and housing over 300 stores, it is the second-largest mall in New Jersey, the third-largest mall in the New York metropolitan area, and one of the highest-revenue producing malls in the United States.

The mall had sales of $500 per square foot in 2013, about $320 above the national average; Garden State Plaza is one of the most profitable malls in the country. In a study of malls in the United States performed on behalf of CNBC, published in 2018, Westfield Garden State Plaza ranked ninth in the nation, based on sales of $950 per square foot. Most of the mall, especially retail outlets, is closed on Sunday in accordance with state and local blue laws.

In a borough in which half of the property tax revenue comes from retail properties, Garden State Plaza accounts for 10% of the property taxes collected in Paramus.

History
The site at the southwest corner of Route 4 and Route 17 that would become Garden State Plaza was next to a drive-in theater dating back to the 1930s. Allied Stores and Macy's had discussed a shared project at the site that was abandoned in August 1953, after which Allied Stores pursued development of the Bergen Mall (since renamed as Bergen Town Center), that would be located a mile away on Route 4 and which was scheduled to open in September 1957 with Stern's as its anchor store.

R.H. Macy announced the creation of Garden State Plaza in May 1954, establishing a subsidiary that would own and operate the mall. JC Penney announced in June 1955 that the company would construct an  standalone three-story building as part of the project, with the infrastructure to add a fourth floor, as needs grew. In September 1958, long-time Macy's rival Gimbel's announced that it was acquiring access to a building site in the mall for a facility that would include  of retail space on three floors, with completion expected in 1960.

Garden State Plaza opened on May 1, 1957, as the first suburban mall in New Jersey, with plans to be "the largest in the state". On opening day, Garden State Plaza had 75,000 shoppers at a mall that was anchored by a  Bamberger's store on three floors and included 60 retail stores and 5,500 parking spaces on a site that covered . The formal ribbon cutting ceremony included the mayor of Paramus Fred C. Galda and a local eight-year-old who cut a ribbon with one thousand dimes as a fundraiser for the National Foundation for Infantile Paralysis (since renamed as the March of Dimes), part of an awareness campaign to encourage people to get the polio vaccine.

Its original three anchor stores were Bamberger's, Gimbels, and JCPenney, with the rest of the mall consisting of 90 smaller specialty shops. It was called "the largest shopping center in the world." Constructed by the Muscarelle Construction Company for owner/developer R.H. Macy & Co. as an open-air shopping "plaza", total construction costs for the mall were $26 million (equivalent to $ in ).

Garden State Plaza drew much business from nearby New York towns and cities, whose shoppers wandered across state lines to take advantage of New Jersey's lower sales taxes and its policy that exempted clothing purchases from sales tax. By 1961, it was the world's largest mall.

In 1975, the mall began a multi-phased, years-long project that would fully enclose the mall, converting exterior passageways into covered spaces. The project, budgeted at $20 million, would add  of retail space, bringing the total to  upon completion.

A $21 million construction project in 1981 converted access tunnels into a second level for the mall, added  of retail space.

The mall was enclosed between 1981 and 1984 in response to competitive pressure from newer fully enclosed malls such as the Willowbrook Mall in nearby Wayne. Later in the 1980s, a lower level was added by converting a former basement truck tunnel into retail space. The existing JCPenney basement was given a new entrance on the lower level, but since the floors were at slightly different elevations, that entrance features the shortest escalator in North America, at a height of six steps.

In 1987, Gimbels' parent company, BATUS, which had been selling off its Gimbels' stores, sold its Garden State Plaza location to Associated Dry Goods. Associated reopened the store as the new headquarters for its Hahne's department stores. Hahne's had previously been headquartered at its flagship store in downtown Newark, which the company wanted to close. In the mid-1990s, a Nobody Beats the Wiz store was added as an out-parcel to the mall site; it later became a Best Buy store that closed in 2018. The site was then occupied by a toy store called Toy City, owned by Party City.

On September 7, 1990, Nordstrom opened its first New Jersey location, building a $37 million, three-level store on the former Hahne's site. In 1996, the luxury department store chain Lord & Taylor opened a store in the mall, which was its seventh in the state at the time.

A Venetian carousel was also added at that time of the expansion and remodeling and was located in front of Macy's. The carousel closed in 2016, and was removed so that the mall could use that space for performances by the Bergen Performing Arts Center.

Westfield acquired the mall in 1986 from Macy's in a deal that also included New Jersey's Brunswick Square Mall and Quaker Bridge Mall.

The Borough of Paramus petitioned the New Jersey Supreme Court to review a decision by borough's Planning Board, asking it to review the plans to construct a  "entertainment lifestyle precinct" at the mall that included a 16-screen AMC movie theater and 10 specialty retail stores, along with a  parking lot below the new wing, known as "Parking Garage C". The petition was turned down, and the mall celebrated its 50th anniversary with the new expansion and stores opened on May 25, 2007.

In 2013, the mall rebuilt Parking Garage B, expanding it to five levels and 1,800 parking spaces. Adjacent were built a new guest services office and a valet lounge. A year later, the mall added a  wing at a cost of $160 million known as the "Fashion District" that has 22 stores and restaurants.

In January 2018, Best Buy announced that they would be closing their two-level store at Garden State Plaza and would be relocating to a single-floor building to be constructed at The Outlets at Bergen Town Center nearby. The store officially moved on April 14, 2018. J. C. Penney closed on  March 10, 2018. Both stores are expected to be redeveloped by Westfield in the future, though as of October 2018, no such development has been announced. In July 2018 North Jersey Media Group reported that Uniqlo will be relocating from Westfield Garden State Plaza to Paramus Park. The Paramus Park Uniqlo officially opened on March 1, 2019. Westfield Garden State Plaza announced plans to build a mixed development center in the old JCPenney space.

In July 2019, Tru Kids announced that one of two Toys "R" Us stores being opened by that company as part of that toy retailer's recovery from Chapter 11 bankruptcy in 2017 and its acquisition by Tru Kids, would be at Garden State Plaza. (The other would be opened at The Galleria in Houston.) Eschewing the "warehouse" arrangement of previous stores, Toys "R" Us stores, these revamped versions were much smaller, and centered around open play areas, interactive displays and areas for special events and birthday parties. It opened on November 27, 2019. However it closed on January 28, 2021.

In September 2019, the mall announced that it would developing mixed-use projects with dining and other retail on the ground floors of the buildings and housing on the upper floors, which would be constructed in areas now covered by parking lots on the periphery of the mall. Construction of this housing would count towards the borough's affordable housing obligations and would serve as a downtown "town square" for Paramus.

On August 27, 2020, Lord & Taylor, which had filed for Chapter 11 bankruptcy protection on August 2, announced that it would close all 38 of its stores.

Blue laws
Due to New Jersey state blue laws that only apply in Bergen County and more restrictive limitations in place in Paramus restricting business on Sunday, Garden State Plaza is almost completely closed on Sundays, except for some of the restaurants and the movie theater, all of which have special Sunday entrances. On Sundays, Garden State Plaza's parking lot is accessible only from the Route 4 and Route 17 access points. Gates are down so that the access roads from the secondary streets are blocked. The Paramus Borough Code forbids the performance of any "worldly employment" on Sunday, with very limited exceptions. These laws were enacted shortly after Garden State Plaza opened, out of fear that the mall would cause high levels of traffic congestion on the highways in the borough. During the aftermath of Hurricane Sandy, Governor of New Jersey Chris Christie issued an executive order that suspended the state's blue laws, allowing stores to be open on Sunday, November 4, 2012, for the benefit of those severely affected by the hurricane. A week later, after a public outcry that included the mayor of Paramus announcing that the borough would continue to enforce its own restrictions, the state's blue laws were put back into effect.

Public transportation
Westfield Garden State Plaza serves as a local transportation hub. The mall is served by NJ Transit bus lines routes 163, 171, 175, 707, 709, 756, 758 and 770.

Incidents

On November 4, 2013, 20-year-old Richard Shoop, armed with a SIG 556R semi-automatic rifle, fired multiple shots in the mall. Customers and employees were evacuated immediately from the mall premises shortly after the shots were fired and the mall was on lockdown for hours. The mall remained closed the following day. No one was injured or killed, other than Shoop himself, who committed suicide at 3:20 AM.

Popular culture 
 Garden State Plaza is the setting for Tricia Sullivan's science fiction novel Maul (2002). The novel takes its title from the way that the word "mall" is pronounced with the New Jersey accent. In the novel, three teenage girls start a shoot out with a local gang.
 Several episodes of The Sopranos, the HBO mob drama were filmed at the mall, which was called the "Paramus Mall". 
 The 2005 Sesame Street direct-to-video special All Star Alphabet, featuring Stephen Colbert and Nicole Sullivan, was filmed on location at the mall.

See also

Shopping malls in New Jersey
Westfield Group

References

External links

 Westfield Garden State Plaza
 Westfield Garden State Plaza, International Council of Shopping Centers
 Aerial View
 Karsian, Dillon (May 1, 1999). "Garden State Plaza Reshaped Landscape". Retail Traffic.

Paramus, New Jersey
Shopping malls in New Jersey
Shopping malls established in 1957
1957 establishments in New Jersey
Garden State Plaza
Buildings and structures in Bergen County, New Jersey
Tourist attractions in Bergen County, New Jersey
Shopping malls in the New York metropolitan area
Attacks on shopping malls
Attacks on buildings and structures in the United States
IMAX venues